Forest Bay Pond is a small wetland in Anguilla, a British Overseas Territory in the Caribbean Sea. It forms one of the territory's Important Bird Areas (IBAs).

Description
It receives water from rainfall runoff as well as seawater seepage from the bay. It consists of two basins that are separated by a mudflat when the water level is low. The western and southern side has a substrate of limestone; that of the eastern is sand and marl. The pond contains widgeongrass while its surrounds are vegetated with white and buttonwood mangroves, as well as sea grape and other shrubs.

Birds
The IBA was identified as such by BirdLife International because it supports populations of green-throated caribs, Caribbean elaenias, pearly-eyed thrashers and Lesser Antillean bullfinches.

References

Important Bird Areas of Anguilla
Lagoons of Anguilla
Wetlands of Anguilla